Giləzi (Tat: Güləzi) is a village and the most populous municipality in the Khizi Rayon of Azerbaijan.  It has a population of 3,530.

References 

Populated places in Khizi District